Nationality words link to articles with information on the nation's poetry or literature (for instance, Irish or France).

Events
 English poet John Milton loses the last of his eyesight during the year; his first wife Mary (née Powell, 1625) dies on May 5.
 A translation by Saiyid Aidarus of the Arabic religious poem "Hamziya" is the earliest known written example of Swahili literature.

Works published
 Edward Benlowes, Theophila; or, Loves Sacrifice, including some Latin poetry and translations
 Richard Crashaw, Carmen Deo Nostro, Te Decet Hymnus: Sacred poems, containing poems from Steps to the Temple 1646, and new poetry
 Sir Richard Fanshawe, Selected Parts of Horace, Prince of Lyricks, published anonymously; Latin and English verse on facing pages
 John Hall, translator, Of the Height of Eloquence by Longinus (a work now known in English as On the Sublime)
 John Phillips published a Latin reply to the anonymous attack on John Milton entitled Pro Rege et populo anglicano

Works incorrectly dated this year
 Anonymous, A Hermeticall Banquet, published in 1651, according to The Concise Oxford Chronology of English Literature, although the book states "1652"; some attribute the book to James Howell, others to Thomas Vaughan

Births
Death years link to the corresponding "[year] in poetry" article:
 May - Jane Barker (died 1732), English poet and playwright
 Hanabusa Itchō (died 1724), Japanese painter, calligrapher, and haiku poet
 Nahum Tate (died 1715), Irish poet
 Probable date - Vemana (died 1730), Telugu poet

Deaths
Birth years link to the corresponding "[year] in poetry" article:
 April 12 - John Vicars (born 1582), English contemporary biographer, poet and polemicist of the English Civil War
 May - Claude de L'Estoile (born 1602), French playwright and poet
 June 25 - Abraham von Franckenberg (born 1593), German mystic, author, poet and hymn-writer
 October 20 - Antonio Coello (born 1611), Spanish dramatist and poet
 November 21 - Jan Brożek (born 1585), Polish mathematician, astronomer, physician, poet, writer, musician and rector
 Tadhg mac Dáire Mac Bruaideadha (born 1570), Irish Gaelic poet and historian, killed
 Wang Duo (born 1592), Chinese calligrapher, painter and poet
 Approximate date - Brian Mac Giolla Phádraig (born 1580), Irish Gaelic scholar and poet, killed

See also

 Poetry
 17th century in poetry
 17th century in literature

Notes

17th-century poetry
Poetry